The Tamil Sangams (Tamil: சங்கம் caṅkam, Old Tamil 𑀘𑀗𑁆𑀓𑀫𑁆, from Sanskrit saṅgha) were assemblies of Tamil scholars and poets that, according to traditional Tamil accounts, occurred in the remote past. Scholars believe that these assemblies were originally known as kooṭam or "gathering," which was also a name for Madurai. Three assemblies are described. The legend has it that the first two were held in cities since "taken by the sea", and the third was held in the present-day city of Madurai.

The Sangam period extended from roughly 200 BCE to 200 CE (early Chola period before the interregnum), when the earliest extant works of Tamil literature were written (also known as Sangam literature).  However, the name Sangam and the associated legends probably derive from a much later period.
Whilst the accounts of first two Sangams are generally rejected as ahistorical, some modern scholars, such as Kamil Zvelebil, find a kernel of truth in them, suggesting that they may be based on one or more actual historical assemblies. Others reject the entire notion as not factual. Nevertheless, legends of the Sangams played a significant role in inspiring political, social, and literary movements in Tamil Nadu in the early 20th century.

Sangam legends 
Early literature from the pre-Pallava dynasty period does not contain any mention of the Sangam academies, although some early poems imply a connection between the city of Madurai, which later legends associate with the third Sangam, and Tamil literature and the cultivation of the language. The earliest express references to the academies are found in the songs of Appar and Sampandar, Shaivite poets who lived in the 7th century.  The first full account of the legend is found in a commentary to the Iraiyanar Akapporul by Nakkīrar (c. 7th/8th century CE). Nakkīrar describes three "Sangams" (caṅkam) spanning thousands of years.

The first Sangam (mutaṟcaṅkam) is described as having been held at "the Madurai which was submerged by the sea", lasted a total of 4400 years, and had 549 members, which supposedly included some gods of the Hindu pantheon such as Siva, Kubera, Murugan and Agastya. A total of 4449 poets are described as having composed songs for this Sangam. There were 89 Pandiya kings starting from Kaysina valudi to Kadungon were decedents and rulers of that period.

The second Sangam (iṭaicaṅkam) was convened in Kapatapuram. This Sangam lasted for 3700 years and had 59 members, with 3700 poets participating. There were 59 Pandiya kings starting from Vendercceliyan to Mudattirumaran were decedents and rulers of that period. This city was also submerged in sea. The third Sangam (kaṭaicaṅkam) was purportedly located in the current city of Madurai and lasted for 1850 years. There were 49 Pandiya kings starting from Mudattirumaran (who came away from Kabadapuram to present Madurai) to Ukkirapperu Valudi were decedents and rulers of that period. The academy had 49 members, and 449 poets are described as having participated in the Sangam.

There are a number of other isolated references to the legend of academies at Madurai scattered through Shaivite and Vaishnavite devotional literature throughout later literature.  The next substantive references to the legend of the academies, however, appear in two significantly later works, namely, the Thiruvilaiyadal Puranam of Perumpaṟṟapuliyūr Nambi, and the better-known work of the same title by Paranjothi Munivar.  These works describe a legend that deals mostly with the third Sangam at Madurai, and is so substantially different from that set out in Nakkirar's commentary that some authors such as Zvelebil speculate that it may be based on a different, and somewhat independent, tradition.

In Nambi's account, the 49 members of the third Sangam led by Kapilar, Paraṇar and Nakkīrar were great devotees of Shiva, numbered amongst the 63 nayanars. Nakkirar himself is said to have later headed the Sangam, and to have debated Shiva.
The Sangam is described as having been held on the banks of the Pond of Golden Lotuses in the Meenakshi-Sundaresvarar Temple in Madurai.

In contemporary versions of the legend, the cities where the first two Sangams were held are said to have been located on Kumari Kandam, a fabled lost continent, that lay to the South of mainland India, and which was described as the cradle of Tamil culture.

Kumari Kandam supposedly lay south of present-day Kanyakumari District and, according to these legends, was seized by the sea in a series of catastrophic floods.

Historicity 
According to P. T. Srinivasa Iyengar who made research on this topic mentions in his book "History of Tamils" Chapter XVI on topic "Criticism of the legend", as the years mentioned for the Three Tamil Sangams are too vast.

 The First Sangam lasted 4440 years and spanned 89 succeeding kings.
 The Second Sangam lasted 3700 years and spanned 59 succeeding kings.
 The Third Sangam lasted 1800 years and spanned 49 succeeding kings.

According to Kamil Zvelebil, the assemblies may have been founded and patronised by the Pandian kings and functioning in three different capitals consecutively till the last sangam was set up in Madurai. Zvelebil argues that the appearance of the tradition in literary and epigraphical sources means that it cannot be dismissed as pure fiction.  He suggests that the Sangam legends are based on a historical "body of scholiasts and grammarians 'sits' as a norm-giving, critical college of literary experts, and shifts its seat according to the geopolitical conditions of the Pandiyan kingdom."

In 470 CE, a Dravida Sangha was established in Madurai by a Jain named Vajranandi. During that time the Tamil region was ruled by the Kalabhras dynasty. The Kalabhra rulers were followers of either Buddhism or Jainism. The Dravida Sangha took much interest in the Tamil language and literature. George L. Hart suggests that later legends about Tamil Sangams may have been based on the Jaina assembly.

Sangam literature 

The earliest extant works of Tamil literature date back to the period between 400 BCE and 200 CE and deal with love, war, governance, trade and bereavement.  The literature of this period has been referred to as The Sangam literature and the period in which these works were composed is referred to as the Sangam period, alluding to the legends.  Although the term Sangam literature is applied to the corpus of the earliest known Tamil literature, the name Sangam and the legend were probably from a much later period.

An accurate chronological assessment of literary works has been rendered difficult due to lack of concrete scientific evidence to support conflicting claims.  Undue reliance on the Sangam legends has thus culminated in controversial opinions or interpretations among scholars, confusion in the dates, names of authors, and doubts of even their existence in some cases.  The earliest archaeological evidence connecting Madurai and the Sangams is the 10th century Cinnamanur inscription of the Pandyas.

See also 
Madurai Tamil Sangam
List of Sangam poets

Notes

References 

Ancient Tamil Nadu
Indian literature
Tamil organisations
Tamil-language literature
Cultural history of Tamil Nadu